Komorli (also Romanized as Komorlī) is a village in Golidagh Rural District, Golidagh District, Maraveh Tappeh County, Golestan Province, Iran. At the 2006 census, its population was 323, in 69 families.

References 

Populated places in Maraveh Tappeh County